Miller's Cornfield (usually referred to as 'the Cornfield') is a section of the Antietam battlefield of the American Civil War.

It is remembered as the site of some of the most savage fighting of the Battle of Antietam, which itself was the bloodiest single-day action of the Civil War. The Union and Confederates fought in the cornfield, many being wounded.

References
 
 
 

 National Park Service pamphlet The Cornfield Trail - September Harvest of Death, pp. 1–2.
 Antietam's Cornfield - a blog dedicated to preserving and sharing stories of the events of 17 September 1862 - https://antietamscornfield.com/

Battlefields of the Eastern Theater of the American Civil War
Battle of Antietam